No. 518 Squadron RAF was a meteorological squadron of the Royal Air Force during the Second World War.  The weather observations they collected helped inform Group Captain James Martin Stagg's recommendation to General Dwight D. Eisenhower to delay the launching of the D-Day invasion of Normandy from 5 June to 6 June 1944.

History
No. 518 Squadron formed on 6 July 1943 from at RAF Stornoway, Scotland and was equipped with the Handley Page Halifax. After moving to RAF Tiree on 25 September 1943, and absorbing 1402 Flight, it became operational with daily flights out into the North Atlantic to collect meteorological data. It also kept observations for U-boat activity.

In the run-up to D-Day in the late spring of 1944, the squadron, operating modified Halifax bombers from Tiree in the inner Hebrides, often under dangerous conditions, collected weather observations from hundreds of miles into the Atlantic; these reports were used by Group Captain James Martin Stagg in his recommendation to Gen. Dwight D. Eisenhower that the D-Day invasion of Normandy be postponed from 5 to 6 June 1944.

After the end of the Second World War the squadron moved to RAF Aldergrove in Northern Ireland where it absorbed  No. 1402 (Meteorological) Flight RAF who had been operating Supermarine Spitfires and Hawker Hurricanes. With these added to the squadron, the main equipment was changed from the Handley Page Halifax Mk.V to the Mk.VI. No. 518 squadron was the last of the wartime meteorological squadrons when it was re-numbered to 202 Squadron on 1 October 1946.

Aircraft operated

Squadron bases

See also
 List of Royal Air Force aircraft squadrons

References

Notes

Bibliography

External links

 Squadron histories for nos. 500–520 sqn
 518's role in the D-Day landings

No. 518
518 Squadron
Military weather units and formations
Military units and formations established in 1943